Allan Rupert Moreash (January 29, 1857 – May 17, 1928) was a merchant and political figure in Nova Scotia, Canada. He represented Lunenburg County in the Nova Scotia House of Assembly from 1896 to 1897 as a Liberal member. His surname also appears as Morash.

Early life
He was the son of Charles Moreash and Sophia Eisenhauer.

Career
He was involved in trade with the West Indies. He was elected to the provincial assembly in an 1896 by-election held after John Drew Sperry resigned his seat to run for a seat in the House of Commons. Moreash was mayor of Lunenburg from 1907 to 1908. He died in Lunenburg at the age of 71.

Legacy
His former home, built by his cousins John and Joseph Morash in 1888, is now designated as a heritage property by the town of Lunenburg.

References 
 A Directory of the Members of the Legislative Assembly of Nova Scotia, 1758-1958, Public Archives of Nova Scotia (1958)

1857 births
1928 deaths
Nova Scotia Liberal Party MLAs
Mayors of places in Nova Scotia